Carmen Sandiego is a media franchise that originated with an educational video game series.

Carmen Sandiego may also refer to:

Carmen Sandiego (video game series), an American educational mystery video game series
Carmen Sandiego (character), a fictional character at the heart of the franchise
Carmen Sandiego (TV series), a 2019 Netflix TV series that is part of the franchise

See also 
Where in the World Is Carmen Sandiego? (disambiguation)
Where in Time Is Carmen Sandiego? (disambiguation)
Where in the U.S.A. Is Carmen Sandiego? (disambiguation)
Where on Earth Is Carmen Sandiego?, a 1994 animated TV series